The Academy of Drama and Film in Budapest (SZFE) is an educational institution founded in 1865 in Budapest, Hungary. It became a university in 2000 and the name was changed to University of Theatre and Film Arts.

On 31 August 2020, the university's management resigned in protest at the imposition of a government-appointed board of trustees which they saw as limiting the university's autonomous status.

Notable alumni
Vilmos Zsigmond – Academy Award–winning (1977) (also nominated in 1978, 1984 and 2006), BAFTA Award-winning (1979) (also nominated in 1972 for three different films and 1978) and Emmy Award–winning (1993) (also nominated in 2002) cinematographer; Pierre Angénieux Excellens in Cinematography (2014)
István Szabó – Academy Award-winning (1981) (also nominated in 1963, 1980, 1985 and 1988), BAFTA Award–winning (1985) and Golden Globe Award–nominee (1985 and 1988) director
László Kovács – cinematographer
József Mikó – cinematographer
Miklós Jancsó – Cannes Film Festival Award-winning (1972) and Kossuth Prize–winning director (1973, 2006)
Lajos Koltai – Kossuth Prize–winning and Academy Award-nominee (2001) cinematographer
Gábor Bódy – director
Béla Tarr – Kossuth Prize (2003) and Silver Bear Grand Jury Prize–winning director (2011)
Géza Röhrig – Kossuth Prize–winning actor (2016)
Kristóf Deák – Academy Award–winning director (2016)
Alexandra Borbély – European Film Award-winning actress (2017)
Károly Makk – Kossuth Prize–winning director (1973)
Dénes Nagy – Silver Bear–winning director (2021)
Mari Törőcsik – Cannes Film Festival (1976) and three–time Kossuth Prize–winning actress (1973, 1999 and 2019)
Hilda Gobbi – Kossuth Prize–winning actress (1949)
Ildikó Enyedi – Academy Award–nominee (2017) and Golden Bear-winning director (2017)
Nimród Antal – director
Mátyás Erdély – Kossuth Prize–winning cinematographer (2016)
Kornél Mundruczó – Prix Un Certain Regard–winner director (2014)
Károly Eperjes – Kossuth Prize–winning actor (1999)
Cecília Esztergályos – Kossuth Prize–winning actress (2018)
László Lugossy – Silver Bear Grand Jury Prize–winning director (1985)
Marcell Rév – Emmy Award–winning (2022) (also nominated in 2021) cinematographer
Miklós László – playwright

References

External links
Official website in English

Educational institutions established in 1865
Universities in Budapest
Art schools in Hungary
Arts organizations established in 1865
1865 establishments in the Austrian Empire